The Beijing–Kunming corridor is a high-speed rail corridor running from Beijing to Kunming in Yunnan Province. The main route passes from Beijing through Xiong'an, Xinzhou, Taiyuan, Xi'an and Chengdu before reaching Kunming. Apart from the main route, a branch line runs from Beijing to Taiyuan through Zhangjiakou and Datong, and a spur line from Chongqing connects to Kunming.

Route

Beijing–Xiong'an–Xinzhou–Taiyuan–Kunming (main route)

Chongqing–Kunming spur line

Beijing–Zhangjiakou–Datong–Taiyuan branch line

References

See also 
 High-speed rail in China

High-speed rail in China